Bîrlădeni is a commune in Ocnița District, Moldova. It is composed of three villages: Bîrlădeni, Paladea and Rujnița.

References

Communes of Ocnița District